Deserters is an album by British folk music group Oysterband, released in 1992.

Track listing
 "All That Way for This" (Telfer, Jones) - 4:19
 "The Deserter" (Telfer, Prosser, Jones) - 5:08
 "Angels of the River" (Telfer, Jones) - 5:08
 "We Could Leave Right Now" (Telfer, Prosser) - 3:22
 "Elena's Shoes" (Burgess, Telfer, Prosser, Jones) - 4:56
 "Granite Years" (Telfer, Jones) - 4:20
 "Diamond for a Dime" (Telfer, Prosser, Jones) - 4:07
 "Never Left" (Prosser, Jones) - 3:46
 "Ship Sets Sail" (Telfer, Jones) - 3:26
 "Fiddle or a Gun" (Telfer, Jones) - 4:09
 "Bells of Rhymney" (Davies, Seeger) - 3:38

References

External links 
 

1992 albums
Oysterband albums
Cooking Vinyl albums